Skellig (known in North America as Skellig: The Owl Man) is a 2009 British fantasy film directed by Annabel Jankel, and starring Tim Roth and Bill Milner. The screenplay by Irena Brignull is based on David Almond's novel of the same name.

Plot
Elementary school student Michael Cooper moves with his parents and newborn sister to a decrepit house. Michael feels pushed out by them, while they accompany their daughter. Michael enters the dilapidated garden shed, where he meets Skellig. Louise has been occupied for premature labour. Michael helps by calling an ambulance, but blames himself. Louise sends the girl to a hospital some time later. Dave plans to remove the shed. The girl becomes sick with a potentially fatal heart problem. Michael befriends a girl named Mina. Louise blames Dave for moving into the house. After Dave sets the shed ablaze, Michael and Skellig move to the woods near Mina's house, where he shows her his burned hand. Michael and Mina take Skellig to a tall tower and examine his owl wings. They hold hands with him and fly mystically around in a circle. It is revealed that Skellig can use magic as Michael's hand is cured. Michael talks to Grace, an old lady whom he talks to every time he is at the hospital to visit with the new baby. He promises her that he will visit her. The next day when the baby goes in for the operation, he goes to visit Grace, but she died in her sleep the night before. He runs to Skellig and tells him to cure the girl like his hand. To prove that he can heal her, Michael jumps off the tower, but Skellig saves and tells him to fall asleep while flying and he does. Skellig goes to the hospital unnoticed and walks into the baby's room. He picks the girl from her cot and does as before: flies off the ground and spins around as she lies sleeping in his arms. This miraculously cures the baby, and he returns it to the family. When Michael asks their name, they tell him they cannot find the right one, and he names her Grace. The family return to the house where her room is bright yellow, and Dave works on it while Grace was in hospital. (The baby is named Joy after William Blake's novel poem) Skellig accompanies Michael and Mina at the tower.

Cast
 Tim Roth as Skellig
 Bill Milner as Michael Cooper
 Skye Bennett as Mina
 Kelly Macdonald as Louise
 John Simm as Dave
 Jermaine Allen as Leakey
 Edna Doré as Grace
 Eros Vlahos as Coot
 Alexander Armstrong as Mr. Hunt
 Navin Chowdhry as Mr. Watson
 Nickie Rainsford as Mina's mother
 Tameka Empson as Nurse #1
 Lisa Zahra as Nurse #2

Production
The film was part of Sky 1's plan to invest £10 million in producing three new high-definition dramas. Filming started on 2 September 2008 in Caerphilly in Wales with scenes shot in and around Cardiff, Wales. Cast members included Roth, Milner, Skye Bennett, Kelly Macdonald and John Simm. The film was scripted by Irena Brignull and directed by Annabel Jankel. It aired on Sky 1 on 12 April 2009.

Awards
 Won - Cinekid Film Award - Honorable Mention
 Nominated - RTS Television Award for Best Effects in Picture Enhancement
 Nominated - RTS Television Award for Best Effects in Special Effects
 Nominated - RTS Television Award for Best Make-Up Design
 Nominated - VES Awards for Outstanding Visual Effects in a Broadcast Mini-Series or Series
 Nominated - PI.CA for Everything

Notes

External links

2009 films
2009 television films
2000s British films
2000s coming-of-age films
2000s fantasy drama films
British drama television films
British coming-of-age films
British fantasy drama films
Fantasy television films
Films based on British novels
Films based on children's books
Films directed by Annabel Jankel
Films shot in Wales
Magic realism films
Sky UK original programming